I, Claudia is a one-woman play starring Kristen Thomson, which was adapted into a movie, shown on CBC's Opening Night and at the Toronto International Film Festival.

The play and film, written by Thomson, is a coming-of-age drama depicting the difficult transition into adolescence of Claudia, a 12-year-old girl struggling with her parents' divorce. Thomson plays all of the roles, using masks to change character.

I, Claudia was published in 2001 by Playwrights Canada Press.

See also
I, Claudius, a novel by Robert Graves, dealing with the life of the Roman Emperor Claudius which partially inspired Thomson's themes and title.

External links
 
 "Behind the mask", Eye Weekly, March 29, 2001

Canadian plays adapted into films
2004 films
English-language Canadian films
Canadian drama films
2004 drama films
2000s English-language films
2000s Canadian films